Yannis (or Giannis) Stournaras (born 10 December 1956) is a Greek economist who has been the Governor of the Bank of Greece since June 2014.

Previously, he had been the Greek Minister of Finance from 5 July 2012 serving until 10 June 2014. 
As every Governor of an IMF member country, he is on the Board of Governors of the International Monetary Fund.

Early life and education

Stournaras received his undergraduate degree in economics from the University of Athens in 1978. He received a Master's degree (MPhil) and doctorate (DPhil) in economic theory and policy from the University of Oxford in 1980 and 1982 respectively.

Academic career
From 1982 to 1986, Stournaras worked as a lecturer and research fellow at St Catherine's College, Oxford, and as a research fellow at the Oxford Institute for Energy Studies. He then returned to Greece where he worked as a special advisor to the Ministry of Finance from 1986 to 1989, to the Bank of Greece from 1989 to 1994, and for the Ministry of Finance again from 1994 to 2000.

Stournaras served as Chairman of the Council of Economic Advisers from 1994 to July 2000. In this capacity he helped formulate the Greece's macroeconomic policy in the run-up to Greece's accession to the European Monetary Union (Eurozone), and represented the Ministry of Finance at the Monetary Committee (now Economic and Financial Committee) of the European Union. He was also responsible for consultations with other international and supranational organisations such as the International Monetary Fund, the European Commission and the Organisation for Economic Co-operation and Development.

Stournaras has been a professor of economics at the University of Athens, which he joined in 1989. He is the director of the Foundation for Economic and Industrial Research (IOBE), a Greek think-tank.

Other activities
 European Investment Bank (EIB), Member of the Appointment Advisory Committee (since 2017)
 European Systemic Risk Board (ESRB), Ex-Officio Member of the General Board (since 2017)
 International Monetary Fund (IMF), Ex-Officio Member of the Board of Governors (since 2014)

References

External link

|-

1956 births
Finance ministers of Greece
Governors of the Bank of Greece
21st-century Greek economists
Greek government-debt crisis
Living people
National and Kapodistrian University of Athens alumni
Academic staff of the National and Kapodistrian University of Athens
Politicians from Athens
20th-century Greek economists